It Happened in Flatbush is a 1942 American sports film directed by Ray McCarey and starring Lloyd Nolan, Carole Landis and Sara Allgood. The film is a baseball comedy inspired by the 1941 Brooklyn Dodgers' pennant win.

This film's sets were designed by Lewis Creber and Richard Day.

Plot summary

Frank Maguire (Lloyd Nolan) is an ace ballplayer whose error costs the Brooklyn team the pennant and his place in the lineup. Though still reviled by the fans, seven years later the team owner brings him back as its manager. He takes charge of the team and whips them into contention. The players resent Maguire's drill-sergeant tactics, and when Maguire falls in love with the pretty, new owner of the team Kathryn Baker (Carole Landis), the players use this as an excuse to circulate a petition demanding Maguire's ouster. The manager changes their minds with a speech about how they owe the fans their best effort and leads his team to a league pennant.

Cast

References

Bibliography
 Fleming, E.J. Carole Landis: A Tragic Life in Hollywood. McFarland, 2005.

External links
 
 
 
 

1942 films
20th Century Fox films
American baseball films
American black-and-white films
American sports comedy films
Films directed by Ray McCarey
Films set in Brooklyn
1940s sports comedy films
1942 comedy films
1940s English-language films
1940s American films